The Philippines competed in the 2016 Asian Beach Games in Danang, Vietnam from September 24 to October 5, 2016. The delegation was bannered by 72 athletes in 11 sports including 3-on-3 basketball, marathon swimming, beach athletics, beach kurash, beach rowing, beach sepak takraw, beach volleyball, beach wrestling, jiu-jitsu, muay thai, and pencak silat. Marestella Torres of long jump and Jessie Lacuna of swimming, who were part of the national delegation in the 2016 Summer Olympics in Rio de Janeiro, Brazil in August 2016, were included in the Philippine team. Philippine Amateur Sepak Takraw Association President Karen Tanchanco-Caballero was named as the team's chef-de-mission.

Jujutsu practitioner, Margarita Ochoa bagged the country's first gold medal of the 2016 Asian Games. Annie Ramirez, also from Jujutsu, bagged the second gold medal in the women’s -55 kg division contest.

Medalists

Gold

Silver

Bronze

Source:

Medal summary

By sports

By date

Beach basketball

Women's 3-on-3 basketball

Preliminary

Group A

Quarterfinal

Final rank: 6

Ju-jitsu 

Men

Women

Beach kurash

Pencak silat

Seni
Men

Tanding

Beach sepak takraw

Women's trio
Players
Deseree Author
Gelyn Evora
Josefina Maat

Preliminary
Group A

Knockout round

Final rank:

References

Nations at the 2016 Asian Beach Games
2016
Asian Beach Games